Jeanne-Catherine Pauwels (1795-1889) was a Belgian musician.

She was born to painter Jean-Baptiste Pauwels and Pétronille Vanden Borre. She studied music under Witzthumb and became known as a piano virtuoso. Because she was not professionally active, she was categorized as an amateur, but she performed at numerous concerts in salons in Brussels and attracted great attention for her musical abilities. She also composed music.

References
 Biographie Nationale Tome 16

1889 deaths
19th-century Belgian musicians
Belgian pianists
Belgian women pianists
1795 births
Belgian women musicians
19th-century Belgian women musicians
Women classical pianists
19th-century women pianists